The Britten V1000 is a handbuilt race motorcycle designed and built by John Britten and a group of friends in Christchurch, New Zealand during the early 1990s. The bike went on to win the Battle of the Twins in Daytona International Speedway's Daytona Bike Week festivities in the United States and set several world speed records.

The bike was designed from first principles and hosts a number of innovations including extensive use of carbon fibre, the radiator located under the seat, double wishbone front suspension, frameless chassis, and engine data logging.

A total of 10 Britten V1000s were produced by the Britten Motorcycle Company and now exist in collections and museums around the world.

Motorcycle journalist Alan Cathcart wrote in 2008:

"It's an easy bike to ride, in the sense it's got a very wide power delivery, but to really get top performance, you have to ride it like a grand prix bike...And having ridden all the superbike contenders in the world today, I can say that the Britten is the closest to a grand prix bike...It's incredibly ironic that instead of Europe or Japan, the most sophisticated and technically advanced motorcycle in the world comes from New Zealand".

Specifications

Wheelbase 1420 mm
Weight 138 kg
Fuel Tank Capacity 24 litres
166 HP @ 11,800 rpm
Maximum safe engine speed 12,500 rpm
Maximum speed 303 km/h

Engine
Water-cooled 999 cc 60 deg V-Twin quad-cam 4-stroke
4 valves per cylinder, belt driven
Compression ratio 11.3 : 1
Bore x stroke 98.9 mm x 65 mm
Piston, flat-top slipper
Titanium conrods with oil feed to little end
Titanium valves Inlet Ø40 mm Exhaust Ø33 mm
Wet cast-iron cylinder sleeves / opt silicon carbide–coated alloy sleeves
Composite head gaskets
Back torque dry clutch
Wet sump. Oil feeds to bigends, gudgeon pins, camshaft lobes & gearbox shafts
Programmable engine management computer with history facility
Fuel injection - sequential, 2 injectors per cylinder

Transmission
Gearbox, 5-speed constant-mesh, sequential manual transmission, chain-drive / opt. 6-speed
Primary ratio 1.97
Gear ratios 1st 2.5, 2nd 1.77, 3rd 1.38, 4th 1.125, 5th 0.961

Chassis
Fully stressed engine with ducted under-seat radiator. Top chassis, girder & swing arm all constructed in carbon/kevlar composites
Front Suspension: double wishbones, Hossack suspension. 
Rear Suspension: swing arm with adjustable three-bar linkage
Shock Absorbers: Öhlins
Rake: adjustable
Trail: adjustable
Front Wheel: 3.5" x 17" in-house carbon composite
Rear Wheel: 6.0" x 17" in-house carbon composite
Front Brakes: Twin 320 mm cast-iron rotors with opposed 4-piston Brembo callipers
Rear Brakes: 210 mm rotor with opposed-piston Brembo calliper

Racing Achievements

1991
2nd and 3rd Battle of the Twins, Daytona, USA

1992
1st Battle of the Twins, Assen, Netherlands
2nd Pro Twins, Laguna Seca Raceway, USA
DNF Battle of the Twins, Daytona, USA

1993
Fastest Top Speed at the Isle of Man TT
1st (BEARS) 2nd (Formula 1) Australian TT Bathurst
3rd Battle of the Twins, Assen, Netherlands
NZ Grand Prix title
World flying mile record (1000 cc and under)
188.092 mph (Rider Jon White)
World standing start -mile (400 m) record (1000 cc and under)
134.617 mph
World standing start mile record (1000 cc and under)

213.512 mph
World standing start kilometre record (1000 cc and under)
186.245 mph

1994
1st Battle of the Twins, Daytona, USA
1st and 2nd New Zealand National Superbike Championship

1995
1st World BEARs, rider, Andrew Stroud

References

Motorcycles of New Zealand
Motorcycles introduced in 1991
Sport bikes
New Zealand design